Lycée Paul Éluard may refer to the following French schools:
 Lycée Paul Éluard (Saint-Denis, Seine-Saint-Denis), Paris
 Lycée Paul Éluard (Saint-Junien) in Saint-Junien